Marie K. Rutkoski (born March 5, 1977) in Hinsdale, Illinois is an American children's writer, and professor at Brooklyn College. She has three younger siblings. She graduated from the University of Iowa with a B.A. in English with a minor in French in 1999, and then her English M.A. and Ph.D. from Harvard University in 2003 and 2006 respectively. She lives in Brooklyn with her family and two cats, Cloud and Firefly.

Awards
1999 University of Iowa Honors Program Collegiate Scholar Award
2003 Dexter Traveling Fellowship
2005 Frank Knox Memorial Fellowship
2008 American Booksellers Association's Indie Next List for her debut novel, in its children aged 9 – 12 group

Works
"Arm the Minds of Infants: Interpreting Childhood in Titus Andronicus" Criticism, Volume 48, Number 2, Spring 2006, pp. 203–226
"Breeching the Boy in Marlowe's Edward II" SEL: SEL: Studies in English Literature 1500–1900, Volume 46, Number 2, Spring 2006, pp. 281–304
"Bridge of Snow" in 
"Jacks and Queens at the Green Mill" (October 16, 2021). Tor.com.

The Kronos Chronicles
The Cabinet of Wonders (August 5, 2008). New York: Farrar, Straus and Giroux, pp. 272. 
The Celestial Globe (April 13, 2010). New York: Farrar, Straus and Giroux, pp. 304. 
The Jewel of the Kalderash (October 15, 2011). New York: Farrar, Straus and Giroux, pp. 336.

Young Adult
The Shadow Society. (October 16, 2012). New York: Farrar, Straus and Giroux. pp. 416. 
The Winner's Trilogy
The Winner's Curse. (March 4, 2014). New York: Farrar, Straus and Giroux. pp. 368. 
The Winner's Crime. (March 3, 2015). New York: Farrar, Straus and Giroux. pp. 416. 
The Winner's Kiss. (March 29, 2016). New York: Farrar, Straus and Giroux. pp. 496. 
Forgotten Gods
The Midnight Lie. (March 3, 2020). New York: Farrar, Straus and Giroux. pp. 368. 
The Hollow Heart. (September 14, 2021). New York: Farrar, Straus and Giroux. pp 304.

Adult 

 Real Easy. (January 18, 2022). New York: Henry Holt and Company. pp. 304.

Reviews
"The Cabinet of Wonders, Marie Rutkoski", David Hebblethwaite, SF Site
"The Celestial Globe, by Marie Rutkoski", Charlotte's Library, 4/19/10
"The Jewel of the Kalderash, by Marie Rutkoski", Kirkus Reviews, 9/1/11
"Real Easy, by Marie Rutkoski", Kirkus Reviews, 11/30/21

References

External links
 
 
 
 Author's website

21st-century American novelists
American children's writers
1977 births
Brooklyn College faculty
University of Iowa alumni
Harvard University alumni
Writers from Illinois
Living people
American women novelists
21st-century American women writers